Banvadi (Sadashivgad) is a census town in Satara district in the Indian state of Maharashtra.

Demographics
 India census, Vanvadi (Sadashivgad) had a population of 3944. Males constitute 52% of the population and females 48%. Vanvadi (Sadashivgad) has an average literacy rate of 79%, higher than the national average of 59.5%: male literacy is 83%, and female literacy is 75%. In Vanvadi (Sadashivgad), 11% of the population is under 6 years of age.

References

Cities and towns in Satara district